Antoni Ros-Marbà (born 1937 in L'Hospitalet de Llobregat) is a Spanish conductor and composer from Catalonia. He began his musical education at the Conservatori Superior de Música de Barcelona. He studied conducting with Eduard Toldrà, Sergiu Celibidache, and Jean Martinon.

He coached the last Giravolt de maig directed by Eduard Toldrà: “I worked directly with him. Accompanying the singers with piano, it was a wonderful moment ", says Ros-Marbà. In 1992, he took part in the first theatrical performance of Robert Gerhard's only opera, La Dueña, at the Teatro de la Zarzuela and the Gran Teatre del Liceu.

In 1966, after the founding of the RTVE Symphony Orchestra in Madrid, Ros-Marbà won a conducting competition and was named the Principal Conductor of this orchestra. In 1967, he became Principal Conductor of the Orquestra Ciutat de Barcelona, until 1978, and again from 1981 to 1986. In 1978 he was named music director of the Spanish National Orchestra. From 1979 to 1986, he led the Netherlands Chamber Orchestra as Principal Conductor.

In 2005, on the National Day of Catalonia, he arranged a new version for the Catalonia national anthem, interpreted by the Orquestra Simfònica de Barcelona i Nacional de Catalunya and the Orfeó Català.

In recent years Ros-Marba has conducted the Real Filharmonia de Galicia in Santiago de Compostela, Spain.

A selection of Antoni Ros Marbà's scores is preserved in the Biblioteca de Catalunya. This selection includes scores from the time that Ros Marbà collaborated with Esbart Verdaguer.

References

External links
 Web of Antoni Ros Marbà
 Selection of Antoni Ros Marbà'scores in the Biblioteca de Catalunya
Biography (from management agency)

REDIRECT

1937 births
Living people
Spanish conductors (music)
Male conductors (music)
Musicians from Catalonia
Academic staff of the Reina Sofía School of Music
Conductors (music) from Catalonia
21st-century conductors (music)
21st-century male musicians
Spanish male musicians